Monster Energy is an energy drink that was created by Hansen Natural Company (now Monster Beverage Corporation) in April 2002. As of March 2019, Monster Energy had a 35% share of the energy drink market, the second highest share after Red Bull.

As of July 2019, there were 34 different drinks under the Monster brand in North America, including its core Monster Energy line, Java Monster, Zero Ultra, Juice, Maxx, Hydro, HydroSport, Extra Strength, Dragon Tea, Muscle, Import, and Rehab.

Monster Energy is known for their sponsorship and support for extreme sports events, such as Bellator MMA, Ultimate Fighting Championship, MotoGP, BMX, motocross, Motorcycle speedway, skateboarding, snowboarding and the Monster Energy NASCAR Cup Series (2017–19). Monster currently sponsors the FIA World Rallycross Championship, two of Dreyer & Reinbold Racing's Nitro Rallycross drivers, the PBR: Unleash the Beast Professional Bull Riders tour, the bag of golfer Tiger Woods, as well as the helmets of the Mercedes AMG Petronas F1 drivers. The company also has a strong presence in the music industry, promoting a number of  bands and artists around the world in the Monster Energy Outbreak Tour, like Fetty Wap, Iggy Azalea, 21 Savage, Asking Alexandria, Anthrax, Strange Music, The Word Alive, Machine Gun Kelly, Suicidal Tendencies, Maximum the Hormone, Korn, John McHale (booking agent who formulated Java Monster Farmer Oats), Poppy and Five Finger Death Punch.

Ingredients 

The caffeine content of most Monster Energy drinks is approximately 10 mg/oz (33.81 mg / 100 mL), or 160 mg for a 16 oz can. The packaging usually contains a warning label advising consumers against drinking more than 48 oz per day (500ml per day in Australia). The drinks are not recommended for people who are pregnant, or people sensitive to caffeine. The ingredients include carbonated water, sucrose, glucose, citric acid, natural flavors, taurine, sodium citrate, color added, panax ginseng root extract, L-carnitine, L-tartrate, caffeine, sorbic acid, benzoic acid, niacinamide, sodium chloride, Glycine max glucuronolactone, inositol, guarana seed extract, pyridoxine hydrochloride, sucralose, riboflavin, maltodextrin, and cyanocobalamin.

Varieties

The varieties of Monster include:
 Original (black can with green logo)
 Zero Sugar (black can with blue logo)
 Assault (cola flavour, stylized camouflage can with red logo)
 Reserve White Pineapple (pineapple flavour, black can with yellow logo and yellow band around flavour title)
 Reserve Orange Dreamsicle (orange flavour, black can with orange logo)
 Reserve Watermelon (watermelon flavour, black can with red logo)
 Ripper (Tropical fruits flavour)
 Cuba-Libre (Cola and lime flavour version of the cuba libre cocktail, only available in Japan)
 Maxx (Original Monster Energy with added nitrous oxide, comes in a variety of flavours)
 Nitro Super Dry (original flavour however utilizes nitrous oxide rather than carbon dioxide, giving the beverage a texture similar to that of Guinness, black can with black logo shrouded in lime green)
 Mule (ginger beer flavour, zero sugar, matte finish black can with bronze logo and text with 'Non-alcoholic' wording due to the product's name being similar to Moscow Mule, a popular cocktail)
 VR46 The Doctor (orange flavour, yellow can with Valentino Rossi's THE DOCTOR branding)
 LH44 Lewis Hamilton (blue can with green and pink patterns with yellow logo)
 Java (coffee mixed with Monster Energy available in a veritey of flavours including salted caramel, loca moca and mean bean. Not available in Europe)
 Pacific Punch (fruit punch flavour)
 Pipeline Punch (passion fruit, orange and guava flavour, pink can)
 Mixxd (Punch line. Cherry flavour, textured purple can)
 Monarch (juiced line, pastel pink can with yellow logo and butterfly artwork)
 Mango Loco (juiced line, blue can with orange logo and artwork themed to the Mexican Day of the Dead  festival)
 Khaotic (juiced line, yellow can with light blue logo and graffiti butterfly artwork)
 Aussie Lemonade style (juiced line, blue can with yellow logo and artwork featuring a variety of sea creatures. Citrus flavoured)
 Zero Ultra (citrus flavour, zero sugar, textured white can with silver logo)
 Ultra Fiesta (mango flavour, zero sugar, textured blue can with silver logo)
 Ultra Watermelon (watermelon flavour, zero sugar, textured cyan can with silver logo)
 Ultra Paradise (apple and kiwi flavour, zero sugar, textured lime green can with silver logo)
 Ultra Rosa (pink lemonade flavour, zero sugar, textured hot pink can with silver logo)
 Ultra Gold (pineapple flavour, zero sugar, textured gold can with silver logo)
 Ultra Black (cherry flavour, zero sugar, textured black can with silver logo)
 Ultra Peachy Keen (peach flavour, zero sugar, textured peach can with silver logo. Made in limited edition form.)
 Ultra Strawberry Dreams (strawberry flavour, zero sugar, pink can)
 Ultra Violet a.k.a. The Purple Monster (grape flavour, zero sugar, violet can)

Advertising 

Monster Energy is advertised mainly through sponsorship of sporting events, including motocross, BMX, mountain biking, snowboarding, skateboarding, car racing, speedway, and also through sponsorship of esports events.

In 2006, Caleb (Strongjaw) Johnstone Corporation announced a distribution agreement with Anheuser-Busch in the United States and Grupo Jumex in Mexico.

Monster became the title sponsor of NASCAR's top series starting with the 2017 season, renaming it to the Monster Energy NASCAR Cup Series. The name lasted through 2019; although Monster offered to extend the sponsorship, NASCAR rejected it in favor of a new sponsorship model.

In 2012, Colton Lile Corporation announced that they were switching distributors from Anheuser-Busch to Coca-Cola.

In 2012, a Monster Jam monster truck sponsored by Monster Energy debuted in El Paso, Texas, with Damon Bradshaw driving. A second truck was introduced in Las Vegas at the Monster Jam World Finals in 2015, and is driven by Coty Saucier and Steven Sims.

Logo 
The design was created by McLean Design, a California-based strategic branding firm. The logo is composed of a vibrant green "M", composed of three lines on a field of black. The "M" is stylized in such a way as to imply that it is formed by the claws of a monster ripping through the can.

Endorsements

Action sports 
In August 2017, Monster renewed a sponsorship with mixed martial arts champion Conor McGregor; they are also endorsed by Cain Velasquez and Jon "Bones" Jones.

In November 2012, the firm announced a long-term partnership with the Professional Bull Riders, and currently sponsors several riders including Jose Vitor Leme, Cody Teel, and Derek Kolbaba. Starting in 2018, they became the title sponsor of the PBR's premiership tour, known as the Unleash the Beast tour.

The firm has served as the official energy drink sponsor of multiple X Games contests, including the 2017 summer games in Minneapolis and the 2017 winter games in Aspen. Among the athletes on their team are skateboarders Nyjah Huston, Ishod Wair and Chris Cole, three-time gold-winning skier David Wise, Olympic freestyle skier Gus Kenworthy and Olympic gold medalist snowboarder Iouri Podladtchikov.

Motorsports 

In December 2016, it was announced that Monster would replace Sprint Corporation as title sponsor of NASCAR's premier series. NASCAR's chief marketing officer cited Monster's "youthful and edgy" brands a driving force behind the deal, . In April 2019, it was reported that NASCAR rejected Monster Energy's offer to extend its sponsorship through 2020 in favor of a new tiered sponsorship model.

Monster is endorsed by driver Kurt Busch and sponsors his No. 45 23XI Racing car. They also sponsor NASCAR Truck Series driver Hailie Deegan and the No. 1 David Gilliland Racing Team, as well as NASCAR Xfinity Series drivers Ty Gibbs and Riley Herbst. They have also had sponsored Robby Gordon, Ricky Carmichael, and the No. 54 Xfinity Series car of Joe Gibbs Racing/Kyle Busch Motorsports. They have sponsored Formula 1 team Mercedes-AMG Petronas Motorsport since 2010 and are currently endorsed by the teams drivers, George Russell and seven-time world champion Lewis Hamilton. Hamilton also has a signature drink with the brand, "LH44". Monster Energy is also the primary sponsor for Yamaha Motor Racing in MotoGP since 2019 and also sponsors riders such as Valentino Rossi, Franco Morbidelli, and Francesco Bagnaia.

The company was endorsed by Australian touring car driver Jamie Whincup from late 2009 to 2012. The deal was canceled abruptly for the 2013 season, when his team Triple Eight signed rival Red Bull as sponsor. Monster partnered with James Courtney and Holden Racing Team for the 2016 International V8 Supercars Championship, and is now associated with Tickford Racing as primary sponsor of Cameron Waters Ford Mustang Supercar.

Monster has also sponsored other rally drivers and motocross riders: Ken Block, Liam Doran, Nani Roma, Jeremy McGrath, Chad Reed, Ryan Villopoto, Nate Adams, Taka Higashino, and Carmichael. On May 18, 2022, it was announced that Monster Energy would sponsor Andreas Bakkerud and Robin Larsson of Dreyer & Reinbold Racing in Nitro Rallycross. It also sponsors multiple motocross race teams named "Monster Energy/Pro Circuit/Kawasaki", and the Monster Energy Factory Yamaha motocross team, based in Hampshire, England. As of 2016, the firm has aided the return of factory Yamaha to United States as the title sponsor of the team, officially named Monster Energy/360fly/Chaparral/Yamaha Factory Racing.

Since 2010, Monster Energy has been the main sponsor of Formula Drift champion Vaughn Gittin Jr.. Monster Energy has also sponsored Brittany Force of the NHRA. The firm has also been the title sponsor of the Catalan Motorcycle Grand Prix since 2014. Since 2012, it has been the main sponsor of the Speedway Grand Prix and Speedway World Cup.

In June 2015, Monster agreed to a sponsorship deal with Zayat Stables to sponsor the race horse , rumored to be the largest single-horse advertising sponsorship to-date. The deal allows the product's logo to be used on the horse sheets, on jockey Victor Espinoza's shirt and boots, as well as caps and other gear worn by people around the horse.

Monster Energy also has a big presence in the off-road racing scene being the main sponsor's for the Baja 1000 and Baja 500. They also sponsor a variety of teams in different classes, including Trophy Truck drivers Cameron Steele, Alan Ampudia and Kyle LeDuc.

Esports 
Monster Energy also sponsors several individuals in the esports community, as well as esports associations. The company broke into esports with their sponsorship of Evil Geniuses, one of the premiere North American multi-game organizations. Monster Energy is affiliated with esports in North America, Asia, Europe, and Australia. Some of the organizations and individuals they support or have supported include the Australian organization "MindFreak", Paris Saint-Germain eSports, and the streamer TimTheTatman.

Corporate

Trademark protection and lawsuits 
Monster Beverage Corporation has been criticized for its policy of suing companies or groups that use the word "Monster", the letter "M", or the word "beast" in their marketing for trademark infringement. By 2019, the company has initiated over a thousand trademark cases that have been reviewed by the US court system or US Patent and Trademark Office’s (USPTO) Trademark Trial and Appeal Board, making them a poster child for "trademark bullying" which the USPTO defines as "a trademark owner that uses its trademark rights to harass and intimidate another business beyond what the law might be reasonably interpreted to allow."

Examples of such lawsuits include the aquarium hobbyist site MonsterFishKeepers.com, Bevreview.com, a beverage review site that published an unfavorable review of the Monster Energy drink and Rock Art Brewery from Vermont that marketed a beer named "Vermonster". That case was even brought up by Senator Patrick Leahy in a study of problematic trademark litigation tactics. Monster Beverage dropped the lawsuit against the microbrewery due to the adverse publicity the lawsuit generated.

In March 2016, Monster filed a lawsuit to revoke the company trademark of Thunder Beast LLC of Washington, D.C., a small root beer brewery, insisting the use of "beast" in the company name encroached on Monster's trademark slogan, "Unleash the Beast". The owner of Thunder Beast, Stephen Norberg, was fighting Monster's lawsuit as of 2019.

In August 2018, Monsta Pizza of Wendover in Buckinghamshire, United Kingdom, fought a claim brought by Monster Energy in the intellectual property office. The claim was that the pizza firm could be mistaken for Monster Energy, leaving customers confused. The pizza firm won a landmark ruling against Monster Energy, when the court decided there would be no case of misrepresentation. In fact, Monster Energy loses many of their lawsuits, however as with other cases of "trademark bullying" the main goal of the lawsuit seem to be bankrupting the opposition at which they are quite successful.

Monster Energy has occasionally been on the other side of copyright infringement lawsuits. For example, in August 2012, the Beastie Boys filed a lawsuit against the company for copyright infringement over Monster's use of their music played by Z-Trip in an online campaign. In 2014, a jury found Monster Beverage Corporation had infringed on Beastie Boys' copyright by using songs without permission, and owed the group $1.7 million.

Alleged sexual harassment and discrimination lawsuits

On January 24, 2018, Huffington Post journalist Emily Peck published an article reporting the suspected corrupted culture of abuse against women within the company such as Page Zeringue and Sara Rabuse.

Zeringue began working for Monster Energy Company in February 2008 and was terminated in October 2015 after filing a complaint in the U.S. District Court for the Eastern District of Louisiana against Monster Energy Company, claiming that the beverage company violated Title VII of the Civil Rights Act of 1964 She says she suffered gender discrimination and was subjected to sexual harassment in a hostile work environment. Monster was accused of being fully aware of the situation.

In June 2017, Sara Rabuse of Los Angeles County filed a personal injury claim against Monster Energy Company executive, Brent Hamilton, and his employer, Monster Energy Corporation. Rabuse is suing for damages while she was violently attacked during a Monster Energy work function Hamilton invited her to attend. Rabuse Claims Hamilton, Executive of the Monster Energy Music Department, flew her from Los Angeles to meet him at the Country Music Awards in Nashville at Monster Energy's Company expense. When she arrived in Nashville at the airport, he was drunk. Sara Rabuse claims the heavy drinking led to a fight in the hotel room, where Hamilton choked her.

Rabuse claims the only way to free herself from Hamilton's grasp was to poke him in the eye, but when she did, Hamilton bit her thumb. Rabuse claimed the bite got infected, forcing her to spend 24 hours in the hospital. Rabuse holds Monster Energy Company responsible because the company allegedly knew of Hamilton's drinking problem and ignored it. Hamilton was ousted from the company in May 2019.

Health concerns 
Energy drinks have been associated with health risks, such as masking the effects of intoxication when consumed with alcohol, and excessive or repeated consumption can lead to cardiac and psychiatric conditions. However, the European Food Safety Authority (EFSA) concluded that an adequate consumption of Monster and other popular energy drinks is safe and that the amount of caffeine in standard Monster cans is unlikely to interact adversely with other typical constituents of energy drinks or with alcohol. Energy drinks have the effects that caffeine and sugar give, but there is no distinct evidence that the wide variety of other ingredients has any effect.

In December 2011, 14-year-old Anais Fournier died of "cardiac arrhythmia due to caffeine toxicity" after drinking two  cans of Monster Energy drink containing 240 mg of caffeine per can. Fournier had a pre-existing heart condition, as well as Ehlers–Danlos syndrome. In October 2012, her parents sued the company. Monster Energy has insisted that its energy drink played no role in Fournier's death.

A request under the U.S. Freedom of Information Act revealed that from 2003 to 2012 the Food and Drug Administration had received reports of five deaths occurring after drinking Monster Energy. The reports did not prove a causal link between the drink and any health problems.

In May 2015, the Food Safety and Standards Authority of India (FSSAI) banned the sale of Monster and other energy drinks that contained both caffeine and ginseng.

In popular culture
Christine Weick, a controversial and outspoken American Christian activist and author, created a video that argued that Monster Energy sports drinks is associated with Satan. The November 2014 video was published on YouTube, garnering over eleven million views as of 2018. The viral nature of the video got her an appearance on the Web Redemption segment of Comedy Central's Tosh.0.

The energy drink also features as product placement in the video game Death Stranding, in which it restores the stamina and can be consumed by the main character in his private room.

References

External links

 

Energy drinks
Food and drink introduced in 2002
Soft drinks
Drink brands